Sitejabber is an AI-enabled platform that allows businesses and buyers to interact through online reviews. Sitejabber was founded in 2007 in San Francisco, California and has been described as "the Yelp for websites and online businesses". Sitejabber has a directory of over 180,000 companies, more than 8,000,000 reviews, with over 150,000,000 people having used the site to date.

History 
According to the Sitejabber blog, the service was started in 2007 by Jeremy Gin, Rodney Gin and Michael Lai in an effort to reduce online fraud and improve online transparency. Sitejabber was originally developed with a grant from the National Science Foundation. 

In 2010, Sitejabber partnered with LegitScript to identify fraudulent prescription drug websites and help users avoid them. Sitejabber also formed a similar partnership with Health On Net (HON) to help identify trustworthy health and medical websites.

Sitejabber released an official Google Chrome extension in 2015.

Sitejabber’s services have been covered in publications such The New York Times,  MarketWatch, MSN Money,, The Atlantic,  Wall Street Journal and The Chicago Tribune.   

Sitejabber is a certified Google Reviews partner.

How it works 
The Sitejabber platform allows businesses to source reviews, manage feedback, and use reviews for their online marketing - including publishing or facilitating reviews across destinations including Google Seller Ratings, BBB, and other customer review websites.

In addition, both B2C and B2B consumers create Sitejabber.com accounts to rate and review online businesses using an overall star-rating as well as criteria such as service, value, shipping, returns, and quality. Users can also request reviews of specific businesses. These features are designed to help buyers make informed purchasing decisions while helping them avoid deceptive websites.

Sitejabber has been recognized by PC Magazine and CNN.

References

External links 
 

Online companies of the United States
Companies based in San Francisco
Privately held companies based in California
Internet properties established in 2008
American review websites